The 2008 Championship League Darts is the inaugural edition of a darts competition – the Championship League Darts. The competition is organised and held by the Professional Darts Corporation and has a maximum prize fund of £189,000.

The format of the tournament is similar to the Premier League Darts tournament, also organised by the PDC, except it is contested by a larger pool of players who are split up into a number of groups.

In a first for darts the tournament will be shown in its entirety on the internet. Every match can be watched in the UK on the Ladbrokes and bet365 websites. The tournament will also be available globally through the internet, except in the United States of America where it can't be shown for legal reasons.

Format

The first group will consist of the top 8 players from the PDC Order of Merit who are available for the competition. These 8 players will play each other over the course of a day and receive points for their performance. A win will earn a player two points, whilst a draw will earn them 1 point. All matches will be contested over 10 legs with a player winning the match when the reach 6 legs or the match being declared a draw should the score reach 5–5. When all players have played each other, the four players with the most points will progress to the semi-finals with the winners of those matches progressing into the final.

The winner of the final will progress to the winners group which shall take place at the end of the competition. The runner-up, losing semi-finalists and the players finishing fifth and sixth will move into group two, where they will be joined by the next three players in the Order of Merit. The format of the second group will be the same as the first group with players moving into the third group. In total there will be 8 groups before the final group takes place.

This format ensures that all players who don't win the group or finish in the last two positions will have another chance to qualify for the winners group.

Qualification
Players must have been in top 29 places in PDC Order of Merit following 2008 World Matchplay Darts in order to qualify. 31 places used because of Raymond Van Barneveld and John Part withdrawing.

PDC Order of Merit following 2008 World Matchplay Darts.

1. Phil Taylor
|
2. Raymond van Barneveld
|
3. James Wade
|
4. John Part
|
5. Terry Jenkins
|
6. Wayne Mardle
|
7. Adrian Lewis
|
8. Andy Hamilton
|
9. Colin Lloyd
|
10. Roland Scholten
|
11. Dennis Priestley
|
12. Peter Manley
|
13. Alan Tabern
|
14. Ronnie Baxter
|
15. Colin Osborne
|
16. Kevin Painter
|
17. Mervyn King
|
18. Denis Ovens
|
19. Mark Dudbridge
|
20. Vincent van der Voort
|
21. Chris Mason
|
22. Kirk Shepherd
|
23. Andy Jenkins
|
24. Barrie Bates
|
25. Andy Smith
|
26. Mark Walsh
|
27. Adrian Gray
|
28. Wayne Jones
|
29. Mick McGowan
|
30. Alex Roy
|
31. Wes Newton

Player omissions and delays

Raymond van Barneveld, who is taking a two-month sabbatical from darts, and John Part, based in Canada, will not be competing in the tournament. Adrian Lewis will also enter in group 3, not group 1 as his ranking would suggest, because he has been suspended from playing in any PDC tournaments for two months following an altercation with Kevin Painter. Peter Manley is also entering the competition later than his ranking would suggest, for unknown reasons.

On 1 September it was announced that Dennis Priestley had withdrawn from group 2 due to his ongoing treatment for prostate cancer. As such he has been replaced in group 2 by Mervyn King. Subsequent group line-ups have also changed, with players from later groups being brought into earlier ones. Priestley hopes to return in time for group 7.

Prize money

The prize money for the tournament is a unique concept with players winning a set amount of money for each leg that they win.

Groups 1 – 8

In groups 1 – 8 the prize money will be as follows:

Group Matches – £50 per leg won
Play-off Matches – £100 per leg won

Winners Group

In the winners group the prize money will be as follows:

Group Matches – £100 per leg won
Play-off Matches – £200 per leg won

In addition the winners group will have separate prizes for the winner, runner-up and losing semi-finalists. These prizes will breakdown as follows:

Winner – £10,000 and a place in the 2008 Grand Slam of Darts
Runner-up – £5,000
Losing Semi-finalists – £2,500 each

Prize money won

The following table shows the amount of prize money that has been won by each player.

*Final position money is awarded to the semi-finalists of the winners group (£2,500), the runner-up, (£5,000), and the overall winner (£10,000).

Tournament Dates

The tournament will take place over 9 days throughout September and October 2008. One group will be played on each day. The dates are as follows:

Group 1 – Tuesday 2 September 2008
Group 2 – Wednesday 3 September 2008
Group 3 – Monday 22 September 2008
Group 4 – Tuesday 23 September 2008
Group 5 – Wednesday 24 September 2008
Group 6 – Thursday 25 September 2008
Group 7 – Tuesday 21 October 2008
Group 8 – Wednesday 22 October 2008
Winners Group – Thursday 23 October 2008

The tournament will take place at the Crondon Park Golf Club in Essex.

Groups

The groups are as follows:

Note: Bold indicates group winner, italics indicate the eliminated players. In groups 1–7, players are eliminated for finishing in the bottom two of the league, in group 8 and the Winners Group players are eliminated for failing to win outright.

Winners Group

 Phil Taylor
 Alan Tabern
 Mervyn King
 Andy Hamilton
 Colin Osborne
 Vincent van der Voort
 Mark Dudbridge
 Mark Walsh

Results

Group One

Played Tuesday 2 September, results as follows:

League stages

Final league table

NB: Players separated by +/- leg difference if tied.
Green – Qualified for the semi-finals, Gold – Did not qualify for semi-finals but returns in next group, Red – Out of the tournament

Semi-finals

Phil Taylor 6–3 Andy Hamilton

Colin Lloyd 6–5 Alan Tabern

Final

Phil Taylor 7–0 Colin Lloyd

Group Two

Played Wednesday 3 September, results as follows:

League stages

Final league table

NB: Players separated by +/- leg difference if tied.
Green – Qualified for the semi-finals, Gold – Did not qualify for semi-finals but returns in next group, Red – Out of the tournament

Semi-finals

Alan Tabern 6–5 Andy Hamilton

Kevin Painter 6–5 Mervyn King

Final

Alan Tabern 7–6 Kevin Painter

Group Three

Played Monday 22 September, results as follows:

League stages

*Adrian Lewis hit a nine dart finish

Final league table

NB: Players separated by +/- leg difference if tied.
Green – Qualified for the semi-finals, Gold – Did not qualify for semi-finals but returns in next group, Red – Out of the tournament

Semi-finals

Adrian Lewis 6–4 Denis Ovens

Mervyn King 6–1 Colin Osborne

Final

Mervyn King 7–5 Adrian Lewis

Group Four

Played Tuesday 23 September, results as follows:

League stages

Final league table

NB: Players separated by +/- leg difference if tied.
Green – Qualified for the semi-finals, Gold – Did not qualify for semi-finals but returns in next group, Red – Out of the tournament

Semi-finals

Andy Hamilton 6–0 Mark Dudbridge

Vincent van der Voort 6–3 Adrian Lewis

Final

Andy Hamilton 7–3 Vincent van der Voort

Group Five

Played Wednesday 24 September, results as follows:

League stages

Final league table

NB: Players separated by +/- leg difference if tied.
Green – Qualified for the semi-finals, Gold – Did not qualify for semi-finals but returns in next group, Red – Out of the tournament

Semi-finals

Adrian Lewis 6–2 Peter Manley

Colin Osborne 6–3 Mark Dudbridge

Final

Colin Osborne 7–5 Adrian Lewis

Group Six

Played Thursday 25 September, results as follows:

League stages

Final league table

NB: Players separated by +/- leg difference if tied.
Green – Qualified for the semi-finals, Gold – Did not qualify for semi-finals but returns in next group, Red – Out of the tournament

Semi-finals

Mark Walsh 6–3 Barrie Bates

Vincent van der Voort 6–5 Adrian Lewis

Final

Vincent van der Voort 7–2 Mark Walsh

Group Seven

Played Tuesday 21 October, results as follows:

League stages

Final league table

NB: Players separated by +/- leg difference if tied.
Green – Qualified for the semi-finals, Gold – Did not qualify for semi-finals but returns in next group, Red – Out of the tournament

Semi-finals

Adrian Lewis 6–3 Andy Smith

Mark Dudbridge 6–4 Mark Walsh

Final

Mark Dudbridge 7–4 Adrian Lewis

Group Eight

Played Wednesday 22 October, results as follows:

League stages

Final league table

NB: Players separated by +/- leg difference if tied.
Green – Qualified for the semi-finals, Red – Out of the tournament

Semi-finals

Mark Walsh 6–3 Adrian Lewis

Dennis Priestley 6–4 Wayne Jones

Final

Mark Walsh 7–4 Dennis Priestley

Winners Group

Played Thursday 23 October, results as follows:

League stages

Final league table

NB: Players separated by +/- leg difference if tied.
Green – Qualified for the semi-finals, Red – Out of the tournament

Semi-finals £2,500 each

(1)  Phil Taylor 6–4  Alan Tabern (4)

(3)  Mervyn King 6–5  Mark Walsh (2)

Final Winner: £10,000 & 2008 Grand Slam of Darts place, Runner-up: £5,000

(1)  Phil Taylor 7–5  Mervyn King (3)

References

External links
Championship League Darts page on the PDC website

Championship League Darts
Championship League Darts